Peck's Bad Boy with the Circus is a 1938 American comedy film directed by Edward F. Cline, based on the book of the same name by George W. Peck, one of his stories of Peck's Bad Boy.

Plot summary 
Bill Peck receives ten dollars from his parents to go to summer camp and defend his trophy, however he gets forced to spend the money on tickets to a circus that is in town. In revenge he feeds the lions his mom's sleeping pills and ruins Bailey the lion tamer's act. He then goes into the circus camp and falls for bareback rider Fleurette de Cava, who unfortunately sprains her ankle in rehearsals and will lose her contract if she does not perform in the next show.
Bailey has the idea of giving Bill a wig and having him do the show with his guidance, but just before the act begins Bailey finds out who drugged his lions.

Cast 
Tommy Kelly as Bill Peck
Ann Gillis as Fleurette de Cava
Edgar Kennedy as Arthur Bailey
Benita Hume as Myrna Daro
Billy Gilbert as Bud Boggs
Grant Mitchell as Henry Peck
Nana Bryant as Mrs. Henry Peck
George 'Spanky' McFarland as Pee Wee
Louise Beavers as Cassey
William Demarest as Daro
Mickey Rentschler as Herman Boggs
Fay Helm as Mrs. De Cava
Harry Stubbs as Hank
Wade Boteler as Murphy
Gwen Gillaspy as Stunt Girl for Ann Gillis (uncredited)

References

External links 

1938 films
1938 comedy films
American comedy films
American black-and-white films
Films directed by Edward F. Cline
Films produced by Sol Lesser
RKO Pictures films
1930s English-language films
1930s American films